Salem Township is one of the twenty-five townships of Muskingum County, Ohio, United States.  The 2000 census found 830 people in the township, 703 of whom lived in the unincorporated portions of the township.

Geography
Located in the northeastern part of the county, it borders the following townships:
Adams Township - north
Monroe Township - northeast corner
Highland Township - east
Union Township - southeast corner
Perry Township - south
Washington Township - southwest
Madison Township - northwest

The village of Adamsville is located in northwestern Salem Township.

Name and history
Salem Township was named after Salem, Massachusetts, the native home of a large share of the early settlers. It is one of fourteen Salem Townships statewide.

By the 1830s, Salem Township had a gristmill, a saw mill and two churches.

Government
The township is governed by a three-member board of trustees, who are elected in November of odd-numbered years to a four-year term beginning on the following January 1. Two are elected in the year after the presidential election and one is elected in the year before it. There is also an elected township fiscal officer, who serves a four-year term beginning on April 1 of the year after the election, which is held in November of the year before the presidential election. Vacancies in the fiscal officership or on the board of trustees are filled by the remaining trustees.

The trustees elected in 2005 are Max Fox and Larry Wisecarver, and the trustee and clerk elected in 2003 are Samuel Mitchell and S. Dean Reed.

References

External links
County website

Townships in Muskingum County, Ohio
Townships in Ohio